Mistflower is a common name for several plant species in the tribe Eupatorieae, especially:
 Ageratina riparia, native to Mexico, Cuba and Jamaica, and an invasive species in New Zealand and many tropical areas
 Members of the genus Conoclinium native to Canada, the United States and northern Mexico:
 Conoclinium betonicifolium, Padre Island mistflower
 Conoclinium coelestinum, blue mistflower
 Conoclinium dissectum, palm-leaf mistflower